Simon Isidore Ngamba (born ) is a Cameroonian male weightlifter, competing in the 62 kg category and representing Cameroon at international competitions. He competed at world championships, most recently at the 2009 World Weightlifting Championships. He participated at the 2010 Commonwealth Games in the 62 kg event.

Major results

References

1982 births
Living people
Cameroonian male weightlifters
Place of birth missing (living people)
Weightlifters at the 2010 Commonwealth Games
Commonwealth Games competitors for Cameroon
African Games silver medalists for Cameroon
African Games medalists in weightlifting
Competitors at the 2007 All-Africa Games
21st-century Cameroonian people